The Centro Nacional de Inteligencia or CNI, is a Mexican intelligence agency controlled by the Secretariat of Security and Civilian Protection. Until 2018, the agency's official title was Centro de Investigación y Seguridad Nacional (Center for Investigation and National Security), commonly known as CISEN, which was established in 1989 after its predecessors ceased to operate. The CNI is the main intelligence agency in Mexico.

Formally, the CNI is charged with "investigations and intelligence, which contribute to the preservation of the State's integrity, stability and endurance".

History
The Center for Investigation and National Security was created February 13, 1989, in order to provide the Mexican state a civil intelligence agency more in line with the political and social transformations experienced by the country at that time and suitable for cope with the challenges posed by the end of the Cold War. The CNI has developed an intelligence system designed to alert about civil risks and threats to national security and has trained a body of experienced intelligence professionals to serve the nation. Throughout its existence, it has witnessed the transition to a political system that is increasingly pluralistic, the revolution in communications and information technologies and the configuration of a complex international environment poses new challenges to national security. These realities have forced the CNI to embark on a process of constant transformation, to explore new mechanisms for cooperation and develop new capabilities that, without neglecting the traditional themes of national security, enable alerts from a strategic perspective on an increasingly broad spectrum of risks and threats involving, among others, the social, economic and political development, environmental and epidemiological contingencies and natural disasters.

In the late 1990s, there was a decisive step in the consolidation of the vocation of CISEN to generate strategic intelligence to the transfer of the structures responsible for neutralizing the threats to the newly created Federal Preventive Police. This allowed institutional focus efforts on strengthening the work of collecting, processing and dissemination of strategic intelligence. The terrorist attacks of September 11, 2001 on the Pentagon and the Twin Towers in New York as well as the bombings in Madrid and London in 2004 and 2005, respectively, marked a watershed for the international intelligence community and returned to put the fight against international terrorism as a major threat to security and stability.

Consequently, and against the relevance of these threats, CNI cooperation with foreign intelligence services became a priority with an even greater strategic weight. On the other hand, like all other state institutions, CISEN regime has moved toward accountability increasingly transparent, consistent with the democratic constitutional order in the country, and careful of the peculiarities of the field National Security.

As a result of this, the National Security Act establishing the terms of the responsibility of the Legislative, Judicial and Executive on Homeland Security, and the powers, scope, limits and mechanisms CNI control.

Before taking office, President Andrés Manuel López Obrador had been critical of CISEN's opacity in its operations and practices, which included telephone tapping on the political adversaries and ideological dissidents of the incumbent administrations. This prompted AMLO to release a number of non-sensitive dossiers kept by CISEN, as well as implementing changes to the agency itself, most notably its name to the present CNI in November 2018. Although mostly regarded as a rebrand (keeping its faculties and internal structure intact), one notable structural change was its placement under the control of the reinstated Secretariat of Security and Civilian Protection, thus removing it from under the Secretariat of the Interior.

In July 2021, López Obrador announced that all CISEN files would be declassified and made available for public examination.

National Security Law
The National Security Act defines national security as the actions immediately and directly to maintain the integrity, stability and permanence of the Mexican state that lead to:
 Protect the country from risks and threats.
 The sovereignty, independence, territory and unity of the federation.
 Maintain constitutional order and strengthen the democratic institutions of government.
 Defend the country against other States or subjects of international law.
 To preserve the democratic system based on the social, economic and political.
 The National Security Concept articulates the work of the Center for Investigation and National Security (CISEN) and other institutions of the National Security System.

Heads of CISEN
 (1989–1990): Jorge Carrillo Olea
 (1990–1993): Fernando del Villar Moreno
 (1993–1994): Eduardo Pontones Chico
 (1994–1999): Jorge Enrique Tello Peón
 (1999–2000): Alejandro Alegre Rabiela
 (2000–2005): Eduardo Medina-Mora Icaza
 (2005–2006): Jaime Domingo López Buitrón (1st term)
 (2006–2011): Guillermo Valdés Castellanos
 (2011): Alejandro Poiré Romero (temporary)
 (2011–2012): Jaime Domingo López Buitrón (2nd term)
 (2012–2018): Eugenio Ímaz Gispert
 (2018-2019): Alberto Bazbaz

Heads of CNI
 (2019): Audomaro Martínez Zapata

See also

References

External links
  
  

Government agencies of Mexico
Mexican intelligence agencies
1989 establishments in Mexico
2018 establishments in Mexico